Arlington Heights School District 25 (AHSD25) is a school district that serves and is based in Arlington Heights, Illinois, a suburb of Chicago. The school district serves over 5,550 students in nine schools.

Schools
The school district operates seven elementary schools and two middle schools.

Information based on 2017-18 Illinois Report Cards.

Other Information

Properties 
Seven Elementary Schools 
Two Middle Schools 
A leased private Japanese School 
A leased special education co-op
is also a maintenance facility for the districts vehicles.
A district administration building

Historical Schools  
Dwyer Elementary (Closed in the 1970s) 
Wilson Elementary (Closed in 1977) 
Dunton Elementary (Closed in 1981, Now Administration Building) 
Park Elementary (Closed in 1981)
Kensington Elementary (Closed in 1982)
Rand Junior High (Closed in 1983) 
Miner Junior High (Closed in 1978)  
North School (Closed in 1976) 
North Arlington Middle School (Renamed To Thomas Middle School)
Berkeley Elementary (Closed in 1992)

Administration
Superintendent: Dr. Lori Bein
Assistant Superintendent for Student Learning: Dr. Becky FitzPatrick
Assistant Superintendent for Personnel And Planning: Mr. Brian Kaye
Assistant Superintendent for Student Services: Dr. Peg Lasiewicki
Assistant Superintendent for Business: Stacey Mallek

References

External links

Arlington Heights, Illinois
School districts in Cook County, Illinois